The Planter is a lost 1917 American silent drama film directed by Thomas N. Heffron and John Ince. It was produced by F. N. Manson and Harry Drum and distributed through Mutual.

Cast
Tyrone Power, Sr. as Ludwig Hertzer (credited as Tyrone Power)
Lamar Johnstone as David Mann
Mrs. Tyrone Power as Consuela (credited as Helen Bateman)
Lucille King as Andrea
Mabel Wiles as Patricia
Pearl Elmore as Senora Morales
Lalo Encinas as Magdaleno
George O'Dell as Yaqui Chief (credited as George R. O'Dell)
Alice Winchester as Yaqui Chief's Sister
James Donald as Yaqui Father
Louis Fitzroy a George Ewing
Grace Whitehead as Mrs. Ewing
Pat Hartigan as Andy Meagher (credited as P.C. Hartigan)
Laura Winston as Elizabeth Mann
Lottie Kruse as Kate Sommers

References

External links

1917 films
American silent feature films
Lost American films
Films directed by Thomas N. Heffron
Films directed by John Ince
American black-and-white films
Silent American drama films
1917 drama films
1917 lost films
Lost drama films
1910s American films